HMS Spencer was a 74-gun third-rate ship of the line of the Royal Navy, launched on 10 May 1800 at Bucklers Hard. Her designer was the French émigré shipwright Jean-Louis Barrallier. She served in two major battles, Algeciras Bay and San Domingo, and in a number of other campaigns. She was broken up in 1822.

Wartime career
Captain Henry D'Esterre Darby commissioned Spencer in June 1800.

Battle of Algeciras Bay

As Venerable, the leading ship, approached the wind dropped and she was forced to anchor. Pompee managed to get into action but Hannibal grounded and was forced to strike. In the battle the British drove two of the French ships ashore and badly damaged the rest. The total loss in the British squadron was 121 killed, 240 wounded, and 14 missing. The Franco-Spanish force lost 317 men killed and some 3-500 wounded.

On 8 July a squadron of five Spanish ships-of-the-line, a French 74, three frigates and a large number of gunboats reinforced the French ships. Hard work repaired all the British ships at Gibraltar, except Pompee in time for them to follow the Franco-Spanish fleet when it sailed on 12 July. In the subsequent second phase of the Battle of Algeciras Bay, the two first rates  and  fired upon each other during the night, caught fire and exploded, with tremendous loss of life. The British captured the third rate . In 1847 the Admiralty authorized the issue of the Naval General Service Medal with clasp "Gut of Gibraltar 12 July 1801" to all surviving claimants from the battle; 192 medals were issued.

Spencer joined Admiral Robert Calder's squadron in October 1801.  In December she sailed in chase to the West Indies.

In May 1803 Captain Robert Stopford recommissioned Spencer. On 28 August Spencer recaptured the East Indiaman Lord Nelson. On 28 May she recaptured Castle Douglas, and the next month, on 10 June, she recaptured Lord North. On 20 November Spencer captured Virgin del Brien Consiglio, and then nine days later, Nostra Senora del Carmen, J. de Moro, Master.

San Domingo
Spencer joined Admiral Nelson off Toulon in August 1804. Spencer was then part of a squadron off Cadiz under Vice-admiral John Duckworth, when news reached Duckworth that two French squadrons had sailed from Brest in December 1805. Duckworth took his squadron to Barbados to search for them, eventually sighting Leissègues' squadron off San Domingo on 6 February 1806. The lines moved to attack the French ships and the battle broke out.

During the battle, Superb badly damaged the French 74-gun , leaving her adrift, her rigging shot off and her rudder destroyed. Spencer then took  Indivisible. The battle was a victory for the Royal Navy, and Stopford and the other captains received a Naval Gold Medal for their actions. In 1847 the Admiralty authorized the issue of the Naval General Service Medal with clasp "St. Domingo" to all surviving claimants from the battle; 396 medals were issued.

Next, Stopford and Spencer participated in the British invasions of the Río de la Plata and Battle of Copenhagen.

Raid off Kristiansand
 Spencer arrived off Kristiansand, Norway on 18 September 1807 with two other ships. The ships withdrew after they were fired on by Christiansholm Fortress. The ship's commander decided to occupy the abandoned Fredriksholm Fortress in the Kristiansand fjord, and demolish it. Charges were laid but after waiting some time for the explosion, men were sent back to check if the fuses had gone out. They had not, and four of the men were killed in the resulting explosion.

In April 1808 Captain John Quilliam took command and sailed Spencer in the Channel, where she served as the flagship for now Admiral Stopford.

American War of 1812
Spencer underwent major repairs at Plymouth from October 1811 until March 1814. Captain Richard Raggett recommissioned her in January 1814, during the American War of 1812, and sailed her to British North America, escorting a convoy, remaining on the North America Station. Later in 1814 he patrolled in the Gulf of Maine. After a failed and embarrassing September attempt to gain ransom from a little coaster out of Boston, Raggett turned his wrath on lightly defended Cape Cod towns. Eastham coughed up over $1,200 and Brewster paid $4,000 to avoid bombardment. Bolder people resided in Barnstable and Orleans. The two towns rejected Raggett's demands and prepared to resist. Raggett decided to move on, but locals tagged his ship with the nickname "Terror of the Bay". Earlier, Spencer shared in the capture of the American brigantine Superb.

After a successful cruise in the summer of 1814 during which she captured the Royal Navy schooner , the American privateer Syren returned to the United States but as she approached the Delaware River the British blockading ships gave chase. Her crew set her on fire before making their escape.

Post-war career
From August 1815, Spencer served as a guardship in Plymouth under the command of Captain William Robert Broughton. On 16 March 1817, Wolf, a tender to Spencer, captured two smuggling boats, Albeona and Two Brothers, and their cargo. Wolf was in company with the revenue cruiser Vigilant. In 1818 Captain Sir Thomas Hardy replaced Broughton.

Captain Samuel Rowley replaced Hardy in September. Spencer then served as the flagship for Rear Admiral Sir Josias Rowley at Cork. Sir Thomas Lavie replaced Rowley in turn in December 1821.

Fate
Spencer was broken up at Plymouth in April 1822.

Notes

Citations

References

External links
 

Ships of the line of the Royal Navy
1800 ships
Ships built on the Beaulieu River